Bubbling Over may refer to:

 Bubbling Over (album), a 1973 Dolly Parton music album
 Bubbling Over (horse), a thoroughbred racehorse
 Bubbling Over (1921 film), an American comedy short film starring "Snub" Pollard and Marie Mosquini	
 Bubbling Over (1927 film), an American animated short film
 Bubbling Over (1934 film), an American short subject directed by Leigh Jason